Raines Corner is an unincorporated community in Monroe County, West Virginia, United States. Raines Corner is located at the intersection of U.S. Route 219 and West Virginia Route 122, southwest of Union.

References

Unincorporated communities in Monroe County, West Virginia
Unincorporated communities in West Virginia